The Museo nazionale della Valcamonica is an archaeological museum located in the town of Cividate Camuno (Province of Brescia), which has a collection of Roman-period finds from various excavations which took place mostly in the 17th century in Val Camonica.

Organization of the Collection
The museum is divided into four sections:
Territory - with finds from the Roman conquest in 16 BC
City - with a reconstruction of ancient Civitas Camunnorum
Religion - including a statue of Minerva, one of three copies in existence and perhaps the best one, of the Athena Hygieia of Athens (original of the 5th century BC)
Necropolis - with finds recovered from various sites in Val Camonica
The objects on display mostly come from Cividate Camuno, but there are also items from the Sanctuary of Minerva in Breno.

Photo gallery

See also
Sanctuary of Minerva
Val Camonica

External links

References

National museums of Italy
Museums in Lombardy
Archaeological museums in Italy